Pin Me Down were a pop/electronica/rock side project of guitarist Russell Lissack, of the British band Bloc Party, and guitarist/singer Milena Mepris. The band was managed by Robt Ptak, who had previously worked with Mepris in Ptak's project Artificial Joy. The band made their live debut as a 5–6 piece in May 2008 in London, supporting Yeasayer.

Their first single "Cryptic" appears on Kitsuné Maison Compilation 5 as track number 5. Kitsuné also released a remix single of Pin Me Down's "Cryptic" in June 2008, which included remixes by Paul Epworth, James Ellis, Lissack himself, and others.

Pin Me Down (album)

On 19 July 2010, the band released their self-titled debut studio album. The album was produced by Alex Elena, who previously played drums with Mepris and manager Ptak's band Artificial Joy. The track "Time Crisis" had previously been released on the band's website at the beginning of the year.

Robert Cooke, writing for Drowned in Sound gave the album a negative review of 3 out of 10, saying that the production was a letdown, and "...fundamentally, the songs just aren't great".

Track listing

Singles
"Cryptic" (2008)
"Time Crisis" (2010)
"Treasure Hunter" (2010)

External links
 Pin Me Down on Myspace
  Interview with Russell Lissack about Pin Me Down – Clash Magazine

References

Musical groups established in 2008
Musical groups from London
British musical duos
Bloc Party
Kitsuné artists